The  was an ancient trade route in Japan that is now mirrored by the modern National Route 33. It was established during the Yamato period, was then developed into an official highway during the Meiji period, before being renamed the Prefectural Matsuyama-Kōchi Highway (県道松山高知線 Kendō Matsuyama-Kōchi-sen). On January 18, 1945, it was renamed as National Route 23, before becoming National Route 33 on December 4 of the same year.

The Tosa Domain used a route that connected Kōchi with the modern-day Shikokuchūō sankin kōtai. This route was called the "Old Tosa Kaidō" (旧土佐街道 Kyū-Tosa Kaidō).

See also
Edo Five Routes
Kaidō

References

Road transport in Japan
Edo period